Cathal Joseph "Carl" Smyth (born 14 January 1959), also known as Chas Smash, is an English singer-songwriter and multi-instrumentalist. His career spans more than 40 years. Smash came to prominence in the late 1970s as secondary vocalist, trumpet player and dancer for the English band Madness, with whom he was associated from their inception until 2014.

In addition to trumpet, Smyth plays the bass guitar (having initially joined Madness as a bassist), acoustic guitar and other percussion instruments. He performs lead vocals on a few Madness tracks, such as "Michael Caine", "Wings of a Dove", "One Step Beyond" and "Madness (Is All in the Mind)". Initially an occasional songwriter, he became a more frequent contributor and was credited as co-writer on the band's international hit "Our House".

Early years
Cathal Joseph Smyth was born on 14 January 1959, in Middlesex Hospital, Fitzrovia, London, England, and grew up in Marylebone. As a child he went by the name of Carl. His parents were Irish immigrants. His father worked in the oil business and moved the family from Ireland to England, then to the Middle East because of his work. Smyth has said he was bullied at school in both Northern Ireland and London. The Smyths were competitive Irish dancers, and Cathal grew up around dance, but never took much of an interest until he began to dance as a performer.

In 1976, the North London Invaders recruited Smyth to play the bass guitar with them when he was 17, but he was replaced the following year by Gavin Rogers. During the late 1970s, he became friends with members of the band Madness, and performed as a dancer on stage at their concerts.

Music career

In 1980, Smyth became the last of the seven original Madness members to join the band. He soon moved on to playing other instruments instead of bass. After Madness broke up in 1986, he formed a new short-lived band The Madness in 1988 along with Suggs, Lee Thompson and Chris Foreman.

In 1990, Smyth became an executive for Go! Discs, where, at his suggestion, the label signed The Stairs. He was also responsible for reforming Madness in 1992 for Madstock!, but he left Go! Discs to re-form the band. In 1989/1990, he became friends with former Smiths singer Morrissey, who had once asked him to be his manager. Smyth declined, claiming "I didn't fancy having to iron his socks." Smyth introduced Morrissey to Boz Boorer, who went on to work with him from 1991 onwards. Cathal is also the subject of the 1992 Morrissey single, "You're the One for Me, Fatty".

He also provided backing vocals on Morrissey's version of the Jam's "That's Entertainment". Cathal also had a small part in Suggs' solo career, co-writing the song "Green Eyes," and he also performed backing vocals on The Lone Ranger album. In 1999, Smyth formed and fronted the folk-influenced band The Velvet Ghost, which played at the Fleadh festival in 2000.

In 2002, Smyth started up his own record label, Rolled Gold Records (RGR Music), at an office in Camden Town. He released a debut single, "We're Coming Over", with The England Supporters Band (billed as Mr. Smash & Friends) and it reached number 67 in the UK Singles Charts. RGR released an album and three singles by London rapper, Just Jack. The label also released material by dance and rap artists Autamata and Border Crossing. In 2004, after briefly moving his office to Islington, he closed RGR.

In 2009, Madness released their first album of new material in ten years, The Liberty of Norton Folgate. About this time, Smyth was rumoured to be working on several solo projects, including a dubstep album, according to Mojo. In 2012 Madness followed up "Norton Folgate" with Oui Oui, Si Si, Ja Ja, Da Da.

Smyth announced he was leaving Madness in October 2014, though it was characterized at the time as a 'break' to concentrate on his solo career and not necessarily a permanent departure. Nevertheless, Smyth has not rejoined Madness in the years since the break was announced.

Smyth's debut solo album, A Comfortable Man, was released in May 2015 and reached No. 68 in the UK Albums Chart. In 2016, Madness released  Can't Touch Us Now, the first Madness album since One Step Beyond, to be recorded without Smyth being credited as a member of the band.

Personal life
Smyth became a Freemason in 1994.

After being a couple since their teen years, Smyth and his wife of 28 years, Joanna Brown, separated in 2005. He has three grown-up children from the marriage: Caspar, Milo, and Eloise. He appeared with Eloise at the 2012 Q Awards ceremony. 

After his marriage ended, Smyth started to practise transcendental meditation. He also spent time in rehab in Arizona, and moved to Ibiza in 2008.

Solo discography

Studio albums
A Comfortable Man (2015)

References

External links

1959 births
Living people
People from Marylebone
Madness (band) members
20th-century English male singers
20th-century English singers
21st-century English male singers
21st-century English singers
English new wave musicians
English songwriters
English people of Irish descent
English trumpeters
Male trumpeters
Singers from London
English pop singers
British ska musicians
English reggae musicians
People educated at Dominican College, Portstewart